Diisopropyltryptamine (also known as N,N-diisopropyltryptamine  or DiPT) is a psychedelic hallucinogenic drug of the tryptamine family that has a unique effect. While the majority of hallucinogens affect the visual sense, DiPT is primarily aural.

Hallucinogenic properties
DiPT's effects are primarily aural.  At lower doses, Alexander Shulgin reported effects similar to a flanging or a phase shift. At medium and higher dosages, the effect of DiPT is typically a radical shift downward in perceived pitch. This shift tends to be nonlinear, in that the shift downwards varies in relation to the initial pitch. This can produce bizarre sounds and render music disharmonious. There has been an experiment involving subjects with perfect pitch, the goal of which was to determine whether the pitch difference is truly distortive or linear, the results of which indicated that there is no clear relationship between perceived pitch and actual pitch.  Aside from these, the most prevalent non-auditory effect is inner ear pressure (which has been painful in some instances, for example when combined with MDMA).

Chemistry
DiPT is a derivative of tryptamine formed by substituting isopropyl groups for the two hydrogen atoms attached to the non-aromatic nitrogen atom in the tryptamine molecule.

Pharmacodynamics

Legal status

United Kingdom
As is the case with many PiHKAL and TiHKAL drugs, it is Class A in the UK, making it illegal to possess or use.

United States
DiPT is not scheduled at the federal level in the United States, but it could be considered an analog of 5-MeO-DiPT, in which case purchase, sale, or possession for human consumption or illicit use that is not for scientific or industrial purposes could be prosecuted under the Federal Analog Act. Some of the people arrested in Operation Web Tryp were selling DiPT, however the drug is not explicitly forbidden or outlawed.

However the US Drug Enforcement Agency (DEA) withdrew a proposal to ban five psychedelic substances including 4-Hydroxy-N,N-diisopropyltryptamine (4-OH-DiPT), N-Isopropyl-5-Methoxy-N-Methyltryptamine (5-MeO-MiPT) and N,N-Diisopropyltryptamine (DiPT). DEA withdrew the proposed listing as schedule 1 banned substance after a public hearing in 2022.

Florida
"DiPT (N,N-Diisopropyltryptamine)" is a Schedule I controlled substance in the state of Florida making it illegal to buy, sell, or possess in Florida.

Sweden
Sweden's public health agency suggested classifying DiPT as a hazardous substance, on May 15, 2019.

See also 
 DMT
 DPT
 5-MeO-DMT
 5-MeO-DPT
 5-MeO-AMT
 5-MeO-DiPT

References

External links 
 Erowid's DiPT Vault

Designer drugs
Psychedelic tryptamines
Serotonin receptor agonists
Diisopropylamino compounds